Harold Winter (9 December 1887 – 14 October 1969) was a German sculptor. His work was part of the sculpture event in the art competition at the 1936 Summer Olympics.

References

1887 births
1969 deaths
20th-century German sculptors
20th-century German male artists
German male sculptors
Olympic competitors in art competitions
Artists from Frankfurt